Paul Lanneau (22 July 1925 – 26 January 2017) was a Roman Catholic bishop.

Ordained to the priesthood in 1949, Lanneau served as auxiliary bishop of the Roman Catholic Archdiocese of Mechelen-Brussels, Belgium from 1982 to 2002.

Notes

1925 births
2017 deaths
20th-century Roman Catholic bishops in Belgium